Clyde Singleton is an American regular-footed former professional skateboarder, writer, and chef from Jacksonville, Florida.

Skateboarding 
Growing up skating, Singleton was inspired by African-American skaters Rodney Smith, Ron Allen, and Steve Steadham who were starting their own brands at the time. Singleton recalls watching Fred Reeves win the NSA Finals, the largest skate contest at the time. Singleton watched the emergence of street skating, taking inspiration from many skaters including Ray Barbee, Ron Chatman, and Sal Barbier. Singleton met Harold Hunter and Keennan Milton at Eastern Vert Skatepark in North Carolina.

Professional skateboarding career 
Singleton went pro in 1994.

Singleton appeared in the 2002 film Jackass: The Movie during a skit called The Handrail - where Johnny Knoxville attempts to grind a long rail on a skateboard, with Eric Koston also making a cameo appearance. Singleton also made a cameo appearance in the sequels Jackass Number Two (2006) and Jackass 2.5 (2007).

In 2007, Singleton directed the video Minority Report produced by The Skateboard Mag featuring many notable skateboarders including Darrell Stanton, Nyjah Huston, Willy Santos, Mike Rosa, Jahmal Williams and others.

Writing 
Throughout his skateboarding career, Singleton has written. He wrote an acclaimed skate-blog “The Chronicles of Piff Huxtable." He wrote for the skateboard magazine Big Brother. In the 2010s, Singleton wrote for Vice Magazine.

Filmography

Films
Jackass: The Movie (2002)
Jackass Number Two (2006)
The Man Who Souled the World (documentary, 2007)
Jackass 2.5 (2007)

References

External links 
 MINORITY REPORT - Video by Clyde Singleton
 Clyde Singleton's part in Triology - 1996

American skateboarders
African-American skateboarders
Sportspeople from Jacksonville, Florida
Living people
Chefs from Florida
Writers from Jacksonville, Florida
Year of birth missing (living people)
Artist skateboarders
African-American chefs
21st-century African-American people